Simone Ghidotti (born 19 March 2000) is an Italian footballer who plays as a goalkeeper for  club Como.

Club career

Fiorentina 
Born in Brescia, Ghidotti was a youth exponent of Fiorentina.

Loan to Pergolettese 
On 19 July 2019, Ghidotti was loaned to newly promoted Serie C club Pergolettese on a season-long loan deal. Five weeks later, on 25 August, he made his professional debut in Serie C in a 2–0 away defeat against Como. On 22 September he kept his first clean sheet for the club in a 0–0 away draw against Novara. One week later, on 29 September, he kept his second clean sheet for Pergolettese, another 0–0 away draw, against Pro Vercelli. Ghidotti ended his season-long loan to Pergolettese with 23 appearances, 30 goals conceded and 6 clean sheets, and he also helps the club to avoid relegation in Serie D with a 3–3 draw on aggregate against Pianese in the play-out.

On 22 September 2020, the loan was extended for another season.  Ghidotti made his seasonal debut five days later, on 27 September in a 3–3 away draw against Lucchese. On 18 October he kept his first clean sheet for the club in a 1–0 home win over Pro Sesto, and four days later, on 22 October, his second consecutive clean sheet in a 0–0 away draw against Como. Ghidotti became Pergolettese's first-choice goalkeeper early in the season. He kept his third clean sheet in December in a 2–0 home win over Novara. On 11 April 2021, Ghidotti was sent-off with a red card in the 93rd minute of a 1–0 home defeat against Piacenza. Ghidotti ended his second season at Pergolettese with 35 appearances, 44 goals conceded and 11 clean sheets.

Loan to Gubbio
On 18 July 2021, he moved to Gubbio on a season-long loan.

Como
On 20 July 2022, Ghidotti signed a three-year contract with Como.

Personal life 
On 23 August 2020 he tested positive for COVID-19.
He once saved a penalty from Remco Evenepoel.

Career statistics

Club

Honours

Club 
Fiorentina Primavera
 Coppa Italia Primavera: 2018–19

References

External links 
 

2000 births
Living people
Footballers from Brescia
Italian footballers
Association football goalkeepers
Serie B players
Serie C players
ACF Fiorentina players
U.S. Pergolettese 1932 players
A.S. Gubbio 1910 players
Como 1907 players
Italy youth international footballers